The Central American and Caribbean (CAC) Age Group Championships is an international track and field athletics event for the youngest athletes (boys and girls between the age of 11 and 14 years) organized by the Central American and Caribbean Athletic Confederation (CACAC).  The CAC Age Group Championships started in 1985 in Curaçao and are held every two years. The intention was for athletes at that age to have experiences with a variety of events at that young age.  It has witnessed the international debut of many future stars of the region such as Olympic and World Championship medalist Debbie Ferguson of the Bahamas and 2003 World 100m champion Kim Collins of St Kitts and Nevis.

Events, Categories and Awards

Categories of the championships were subdue to changes.  For the most recent event, competitions were held in the following categories:

Age group 11 – 12 years: “Infantile B” Pentathlon (Scoring will be in accordance with the Games Scoring tables for CACAC age group
Competition):

Boys: 60 meter dash, 1000 meters, Long Jump, High Jump, Baseball Throw.
Girls: 60 meter dash, 800 meters, Long Jump, High Jump, Baseball Throw.
Mixed 4x100 Meter Relay

Age group 13 – 14 years: “Infantile A” Heptathlon (Scoring will be in accordance with the Games Scoring tables for CACAC age group
Competition):
Boys: 80 meter dash, 1200 meters, 80 meter hurdles, Long Jump, High Jump, Baseball Throw, Shot Put.
Girls: 80 meter dash, 1000 meters, 60 meter hurdles, Long Jump, High Jump, Baseball Throw, Shot Put.
Mixed 4x100 Meter Relay

Each federation can enter individual athletes or teams consisting of two athletes in each category.

Medals are awarded for individuals for the first three places in each event in each categorie.  Athletes ranked 4th to 8th receive a ribbon.

Trophies are awarded to teams in each category with the
highest total number of cumulative points in the entire competition. Teams will also compete for the overall title. A trophy will be given to the country with the grand total amount of the sum of all the points of
all the categories. This will include both divisions, male and female.

Editions

Records
Records are set by athletes who are representing one of the Central American and Caribbean Athletic Confederation (CACAC) member states.  The following list of records is assembled from the official results lists.  At the 2011 championships, a total of 15 new records were established.

Infantile A (under 15)

Boys' U-15 records

Girls' U-15 records

Mixed U-15 records

Infantile B (under 13)

Boys' U-13 records

Girls' U-13 records

 w = wind assisted mark

Mixed U-13 records

 Note: The records of the combined events are not confirmed by the cited sources.

See also
List of Central American and Caribbean Age Group Championships records

References

External links
Official CACAC website

 
Under-18 athletics competitions
Age Group